Fernando Morán may refer to:
 Fernando Morán (footballer), Spanish footballer
 Fernando Morán (politician) (1926-2020),  Spanish diplomat and former Minister of Foreign Affairs of Spain

See also:
 Fernando Navarro Morán (born 1989), Mexican footballer